The Greater Saint Louis Area Council of the Boy Scouts of America was formed in 1911 and is based in St. Louis, Missouri. The council serves Scouts in the St. Louis Metro area, southeast Missouri, and southern and central Illinois.

History

It is the compilation of several former councils that have merged with the council over the years.

In September 2016 the Lewis and Clark Council voted to merge with the Greater St. Louis Area Council, effective January 1, 2017.

District Organization 
The Greater St. Louis Area Council has 24 districts.

Camps 
The Council operates Beaumont Scout Reservation, S-F Scout Ranch, Camp Lewallen, and Camp Pine Ridge.

Irondale Scout Reservation 
Irondale Scout Reservation was founded in Irondale, Missouri, in 1920. Scouts first started camping in the area in 1913, when it was known as Grenia Springs. Later it would be called Camp Roosevelt, but the Camp Irondale name was adopted in 1920, when land was donated to the St. Louis Council by Clarance Howard.

Legend has it that Camp Irondale built the first Olympic-sized swimming pool not built for the Olympics. The pool opened in 1945 and replaced the previously used spring-fed pool. A crack formed in the pool in the 1970s after the pool was in the city of Irondale's control and the pool was rendered unusable. Camp Irondale also had a chapel called Inspiration Hall to serve the Scouts' religious needs. It has red granite walls and a gravel floor bordered with flagstone.

The camp was closed and sold in 1965 at the end of the summer camp season. The property was sold to a real estate developer and has been developed into a small subdivision, although many features of the camp remain. The climbing tower, water tower, two lakes, many cabins, the chapel, a post office building, a small pavilion, the parade grounds and flag pole, the new pool that opened in 1946, and the springs that were used to create the old swimming pool. There are also 5–15 old buildings including cabins, nature lodge, and the Scoutmaster's quarters. The old camp is currently under a very slow renovation. A state grant of approximately $90,000 will be needed to fix the Olympic-sized pool and create a new filtration system. The city of Irondale can't afford to fix it by itself and it may not be cost effective for the small town. The Chapel at Irondale has recently been remodeled and rededicated to the city by the Cub Scouts of Pack 697 and Boy Scouts of Troop 697.

In 2010 the Ozark Trailblazers District in the Greater St. Louis Area Council worked all spring and summer to try to restore parts of the old camp that the city of Irondale still owns. The recreation hall was partly restored, the pool was cleaned of brush and trees, several campsites were created, and camp signs were placed around the camp.

Beaumont Scout Reservation 

It is located in High Ridge, Missouri.

History 
The property for Beaumont was acquired during the late 1940s. It was dedicated in 1954. The property was the beginning of the period of transition for the St. Louis Council that would continue to 1965 with the dedication of the S-F Scout Ranch and the sale of the Irondale Scout Reservation, Lion's Den, and Bereton Explorer Base. Beaumont's summer camp is known as Camp May. Camp May was opened as a Boy Scout Camp and served in that capacity until the mid-1980s when its summer programs were redesigned to primarily serve Cub Scouts.

Camps and facilities 
Within Beaumont, there are many campsites and camporee areas that are for Scout use, as well as a set of hiking trails that go throughout the reservation, a climbing tower, a low and high ropes course, a rifle range, a shotgun range, a Scoutmaster's chapel, a maintenance building and ranger's station, houses that the rangers live in, a mud cave, multiple cabins, and Sverdrup lodge, which is used for training and Wood Badge.

Camp Grizzly and Cub World
Camp Grizzly is a Cub Scout area which includes a program hall, multiple pavilions and campsites, an activity field, a council ring, and Cub World, which is a playground area that is geared towards Cub Scouts and their families. Cub world hosts many day camps each summer including Grizzly Camp, which is the council's day camp experience. Grizzly camp includes time at the pool, adult supervision, and a hot lunch every day.

Camp May
Camp May is a Webelos camp that conducts Webelos week-long and Webelos Mini-camp each summer. Some of the facilities are used for other purposes in the off-season. Camp May contains numerous campsites, a pool and shower houses, a dining hall and education facility, a council ring, a trading post, an activity field, a gazebo, a Scoutcraft cabin, an archery a BB gun range, a rifle range, a shotgun range, a nature lodge, and a flag field. Camp May was originally a Boy Scout Camp when Beaumont first opened in 1954. It was founded to help relieve the over crowded Camps Irondale and Lions Den. With the purchase and popularity of S-F Scout Ranch, the council found themselves struggling to fill weeks of camp at Camp May. To solve the problem, the council needed to find another use for the camp during the summer. In the late 1970s a Cub Scout residential camp pilot program was launched at Camp May. It was so successful that soon Camp May was entirely dedicated to running the program. The Webelos programs offered include a full week and mini week experience. In the mid-1990s Camp May had up to 10 weeks of Cub Scout residential camp in operation during a single summer.

Emerson Center
Wright Lodge, the original dining hall that had been built with the original purchase of the property, was closed for renovations in August 2004. The building was expanded making more room in the dining hall and adding more training space. In addition, the office and kitchen spaces were modernized in order to meet the present needs of the camp. The lodge reopened in June 2005 as the Beaumont Dining and Education Facility. At the annual meeting in 2009, it was announced that the building was to be renamed in honor of Emerson, who had made a large donation to the council. In September 2009, the center was re-dedicated as the Emerson Center.

Nagel Explorer Base

Nagel Explorer Base is at the east of Beaumont that is primarily used for Exploring and Venturing programs, but it also host's the council's horse camp for 1-week each summer. Its facilities include adirondacks, a program hall, a rifle range, shotgun range, a horse stable, a program field, a large program pavilion, a horse corral, and an equipment building.

S-F Scout Ranch 

The S-F Scout Ranch or "S Bar F" or "The Ranch" as it is commonly known, is owned and operated by the Greater St. Louis Area Council, Boy Scouts of America. The  property sits in St. Francois County, Missouri and Madison County, Missouri. In its center sits Nim's Lake, and running through it is the Little St. Francis River.

History 
A large portion of the former  of mine and farm lands owned by the Mine La Motte Company, later the Missouri Metals Corporation, was acquired by the St. Louis Area Council in 1961 through the efforts of the St. Joseph Lead Company and Mr. Elver A. Jones, and an initial gift of the Stix, Baer & Fuller Company by Mr. Arthur B. Baer. The name S-F was derived from the St. Louis department store Stix, Baer and Fuller due to their contribution to help buy the property. The property was dedicated during the Shawnee Lodge fall reunion on September 11, 1965 and opened for summer camp in 1966. The need for this Ranch became imminent as a result of the long range plan conducted by the council in 1959 and 1960. This plan, which encompassed a study of the traditional camp facilities of the council such as Camps Irondale, Lion's Den and Brereton, pointed out the need for an area that would be large enough for the council to grow on, and an area large enough to expand the program facilities on, and an area rich enough in history and tradition to offer the incentive for the Scouts of today and tomorrow. The property replaced the Irondale Scout Reservation in nearby Ironton, Missouri which had become too small to serve the needs of the growing Scout Council. Three of the four camps that operate on the property today were a part of the original dedication. Camp Gamble was dedicated on June 17, 1970.

Camp Famous Eagle

Camp Famous Eagle was the first camp to be built. It opened in the summer of 1966. It was named for Morton D. May who was the chairman of the committee to develop the ranch. May had been a huge force in developing the Beaumont Scout Reservation ten years earlier. Because of his efforts the camp at Beaumont was named Camp May. Due to this fact the camp at S-F took the name Camp Famous Eagle, Famous for Famous-Barr (part of the May Department Stores) and Eagle for Eagle Trading Stamps, an in-store promotions at the time. The Fe abbreviation for the camp is also an homage to Camp Irondale through the chemical symbol of iron. A dining hall facility was added to Camp Famous Eagle, opening for the 2015 summer camp season, effectively eliminating patrol method cooking from Famous Eagle.

Camp Sakima

Camp Sakima was the second camp to be built, finishing in time for the first week of campers in the summer of 1966. Camp Sakima is named in recognition of Leif J. Sverdrup who headed the campaign to raise the funds for the Ranch to be built. The Camp was named Sakima, an Indian word for chief which was his nickname, after concern arose about Scout's perceived inability to pronounce his last name.

Camp Sakima was last open as a full camp in 2007. It has been used for the National Youth Leader Training (NYLT) program since 2008. Camp Sakima has recently had some facilities issues, including the need to rebuild a drainage field. After a severe storm in 2008, the Camp Sakima bridge was badly damaged and never repaired. The final pieces of the bridge were demolished in 2014.

John S. Swift Base

The John S. Swift Base also opened in the summer of 1966. It was originally the only camp on the property with a dining hall to serve meals to the campers. It was designed for a high adventure based camp to implement the year-long Exploring program, which would later become the Venturing Program. It is named for John S. Swift, who was the owner of Swift Printing Company. He believed in the value of the Scouting program so much that when approached by the committee to create the Ranch for funds, he happily donated the amount needed for the base.

Camp Theodore R. Gamble

Camp Gamble was dedicated on June 17, 1970. It was built to meet the ever-growing need of space for Scouts that was a result of the Post-World War II baby boom. It was named in memory of Theodore R Gamble who was serving as president of the Council when he died suddenly. He was also president of the Pet Milk Company.

Eugene D. Nims Lake

The S-F Scout Ranch is home to the second largest privately owned man-made lake in the state of Missouri. The lake is an essential part of the aquatic program and was a primary goal held by the Ranch founders. This may be because of the failed attempt to create a lake at the Beaumont Scout Reservation. When the land for the Ranch was discovered it did not have a lake. Fortunately, Mrs. Nims stepped in and donated the $55,000 dollars needed to dam the Wills Branch of the Little St. Francois River. She donated the money in memory of her husband Eugene D. Nims. He was the founder of Southwestern Bell Telephone and the lake bears his name. The first attempt to dam the river failed. Sverdurp engineers designed a second dam that created the  lake. The lake has six miles (10 km) of shore line and seven coves. It is home to many aquatic program features.

Huck's Cove

S-F has its own water park. It is on the southern tip of Nim's Lake. This water park includes: two slides, and a play area with numerous aquatic games and activities.

The Water Treatment Plant

The drinking water on the property comes from the lake. It is treated in a plant located at the Swift Base. The plant is considered a Class C plant by the Missouri Department of Natural Resources. If operated at capacity, the plant could serve a town of 10–15,000 people. The treatment process has undergone many renovations in recent years. It was replaced by a membrane system which went online in 2011.

Other areas

S-F has a number of other areas available for Scout use, including a camporee area, cabins, the Londe Adirondacks, treehouses, a climbing and rappelling area, numerous rifle and shotgun ranges, a high and low ropes course, and many hiking trails.

Programs and activities

Boy Scout week-long residential camp 
Since 2007, Camp Famous Eagle and Camp Theodore R. Gamble have been open. Prior to that, since the 1980s, the three Boy Scout camps (Camp Theodore R. Gamble, Camp Famous Eagle, and Camp Sakima) were open on a rotating basis and only two of them open each summer for Boy Scout Summer Camp.

S-F has long been known for the use of the patrol method. In this model, the core of the summer camp program is the use of the patrol method to cook meals, the menu of which consists of hamsteak, cold cuts, eggs, chicken patties, steakburgers, milk, hot dogs, sloppy joes, and other items. For each meal, Scouts must go to the commissary to pick up the ingredients for their meal. Except for the Sunday meal, which is a meal of spaghetti, green beans, and ice cream cooked by the counslers, the meal is then taken to the campsite and cooked on site in an outdoor kitchen over fires built by other members of the patrol.

Citing lack of interest from units outside of the Greater St. Louis Area Council, as well as with in, a new dining hall was built beginning in the fall of 2014 for the 2015 season. With this addition Camp Theodore R. Gamble operates as the lone patrol method camp in permanent operation, whereas Camp Famous Eagle operates as a dining hall camp.

Outside of food operations, the two camps operate relatively similarly. The week offers Scouts the chance to earn merit badges, participate in aquatics programs (including a trip to Huck's Cove and an evening water carnival), spend time in the field sports area, enjoy an opening and closing campfire program put on by the staff that includes humorous skits and songs, and participate in many other activities. On Thursday nights new members are elected into the Order of the Arrow in a tapout ceremony located at the respective camp's cove.

Recent additions to the Boy Scout Camps have included numerous aquatic activities including floating icebergs, stand up paddle boards, and ski boats. In the summer of 2014, the Eagle Shotgun range opened, increasing the shotgun opportunities at both camps.

Venturing week-long adventure camp 
The Swift Base run programs for Venturers, the BSA's co-ed program for individuals between the ages of 14-21. A typical week for a Swift camper might include rock climbing and rappelling, challenge course, rifle, shotgun, and pistol shooting, horseback riding, water skiing, tubing, wake boarding, knee boarding, mountain biking, and many other fun activities. Venturers are given the opportunity to choose which activities they wish to participate in on a daily basis. Swift is one of only a couple camps in the country running a dedicated Venturing summer camp, at least for multiple weeks. In recent years, Swift has operated four weeks of Venturing programs each summer.

Parent N' Pal 
A short program lasting about 22 hours that provides a brief introduction to outdoor Scout camping for Cub Scouts and an adult partner. Held twice every summer at all of the camps at the Ranch. Held once a summer at Camp Lewallen.

National Youth Leadership Training (NYLT) 
A week long training program six weeks out of every summer by the Council Training Department. It is based on a national syllabus. Starting in the summer of 2012 it began being held at Camp Sakima.

Ranger program 
A traditional program for older Scouts, the Ranger program gets Scouts deep into the backwoods of the undeveloped east side of the property. Scouts are given the opportunity to see parts of the property that they would never get to see, all the while participating in a mountain man style program. Scouts may expect to stay at a new campsite each night and construct a different shelter daily. Activities may include blacksmithing, black-powder rifle shooting, tomahawk throwing, candle making, canoeing, swimming, a Native American-style sweat lodge, fishing, hiking, and many other activities. Scouts who attend the Ranger program learn leadership and team-building skills by working together throughout the week to overcome obstacles.

Other programs 
Each summer other Scout programs are held. Examples include, Catholic Adventure Week, LDS Scout Camp, Shooting Sports Camp, Fishing Camp, and Horse Camp.

Administrative 
The Ranch is led by the ranch director, a professional Scouter who also serves as the director of camping overseeing operations at the council's other properties. In its history, the Ranch has been served by eight directors (see chart below). The rest of the Ranch staff are seasonal contract employees that run each camp's program.

Camp operation 
Each of the Ranch's camps has a camp director who may be a professional Scouter. Each camp has a program director that is the second in command to the camp director. The program director oversees merit badge instruction, campsite program, as well as evening programs that are put on by the staff. The business manager oversees the administration of the camp. There are two commissioners that oversee campsite programs put on by the troop counselors, facilitates leaders meetings, and addresses problems as they come up. The Commissary manager and an assistant run the food service operation in the camp, and the trading post manager and an assistant run the camp store. In addition, the trading post staff assists with food service for the staff. The rest of the staff is divided into program areas. Each area has a director and a certain number of counselors.

Swift High Adventure Base
Given the very different nature of Swift High Adventure Base, the staff is structured differently. Similar to the Scout camps, Swift has a camp director, as well as a program director, and business manager. The business manager directly runs the camp office and trading post, as well as oversees the kitchen staff of two. The program director oversees the rest of the staff of the camp including a field sports director, aquatics director, and wrangler. The rest of the staff serves as program counselors, generally rotating between program sites including rock climbing, rappelling, high challenge course, low challenge course, aquatics area, and ski/tube boat driving. These program counselors also serve as the campsite counselors for the five campsites.

Ranch
Chaired by the Ranch Director, the central administrative staff for the Ranch includes the Ranch Business Manager (RBM), Retail Operations Manager (ROM), Counselor In Training (CIT) Director, Retail and Needs Driver, Chaplains, and program personnel for the shotgun, horse, Huck's Cove, and Ranger programs. The Ranch has two rangers who live on the property year-round and are responsible for the maintenance of the property, in addition to the operation of the water treatment facility.

Camp Lewallen 

It is located in Silva, Missouri. Camp Lewallen opened in 1936, and was built on land owned by the William Lee Lewallen Family. According to the family, Mrs. Lewallen wanted an adequate road built to their farm, and the best way to do that was to allow the Boy Scouts to have a camp there. The property includes the Earl Jarvis Dining Hall, the towering Mount Logan, Scoutcraft, nature and voyageur areas. The Trading Post overlooks the pool for Scouts to relax and have a snack. At the shooting sports area Scouts have the chance to shoot a shotgun, a rifle and bow and arrow. At Lake Potashnik, Scouts can canoe, paddleboard, row, fish and kayak. Originally a part of the Southeast Missouri Council, the Greater St. Louis Area Council took over operation of the property and its programs in 1993. The staff of the camp operates the week-long Boy Scout Residential Camp with dining hall cooking.

Order of the Arrow 
The Council is served by four Order of the Arrow lodges: Shawnee Lodge, which serves the Greater St. Louis Metro area, Anpetu-We Lodge which serves southeast Missouri and southern Illinois, Nisha Kittan Lodge which serves southern Illinois and Woapink Lodge which serves central Illinois. After Greater New York Councils combined its five lodges into one in 2013, the Council is the only BSA council that is home to more than one Order of the Arrow Lodge. Upon completion of the mergers of the early 1990s, it was decided that the council was geographically too large to administer one Order of the Arrow program. The decision was made to merge the Ney-a-Ti lodge, from the Egyptian Council with the Anpetu-We Lodge, and make two lodges within the council. Before the Lewis and Clark Council merger, GSLAC submitted a resolution to National to change the "One Lodge, One Council" policy. National created a committee to look into changing the policy, and will report its research in February.

Anpetu-We Lodge 

The Order of the Arrow existed at Camp Lewallen prior to the Anpetu-We Lodge. Jonito-Otora (Beaver Club) Lodge No. 100 was chartered to the Southeast Missouri Council on April 5, 1937. At that time, the Order of the Arrow was not endorsed by the Boy Scouts of America, and Jonito Otora was disbanded in 1939 in favor of a similar organization called the Golden Sun. The Golden Sun Honor Society was an integral part of Camp Lewallen. The Golden Sun Warrior Circle still remains and is used as the Ordeal ceremony ring. The Golden Sun was disbanded in 1956 to allow the rechartering of an Order of the Arrow Lodge. The Order of the Arrow was by this time endorsed by the National Council as the official honor camping society, and all councils were encouraged to comply. The Southeast Missouri Council was allowed to keep the number 100 for its lodge number, but the youth members chose to change the name to Anpetu-We, meaning "rising sun". This was a tribute to the former Golden Sun Honor Society. The Anpetu-We Lodge was chartered on March 5, 1956. When the Southeast Missouri Council merged with the St. Louis Area Council in 1993, the Anpetu-We Lodge was allowed to exist within the Greater St. Louis Area Council. The Egyptian Council of Southern Illinois merged with the Greater St. Louis Area Council in 1994. The youth members of the Ney-A-Ti Lodge No. 240, voted to join the Anpetu-We Lodge. Today the Lodge is stronger and more active than ever. The Lodge's impact on Camp Lewallen and Pine Ridge Scout Camp, along with the service its members bestow upon their troops, districts, our Council and communities are a testament to every member's determination and Scouting spirit.

Chapters 
Anpetu-We Lodge is divided into five chapters. They are listed below.

 Cherokee
 Egyptian
 Shawnee
 Sioux
 Big Muddy

Shawnee Lodge 

The Shawnee Lodge was formed in 1930 and celebrated its 90th anniversary in 2020. It is a large lodge of approximately 3500 registered members and often draws 2,000 members to its annual Fall Reunion. Several of its members have risen to national positions during its history. In 1986 Steve Meinhold was elected to be the North Central Region Chief, becoming the first Shawnee Lodge member to hold a national position. In 2006, Russ Bresnahan was elected to serve as the central region chief. In the year 2009 Jack O'Neill served as National Chief, the first Shawnee Lodge member to hold that position. Jack served as section vice chief for one year and Section Chief for two years before being elected National Chief. He was a member of the council's Summer Camp staff. He was a part of the Shawnee Lodge Vigil Class of 2008 and is an Eagle Scout from Troop 169, at Assumption Parish in South St. Louis County.

Programs 
 Camp Promotion: The lodge sends members to troops and packs to promote the Council's summer camping opportunities. 
 Lodge Newsletters: The lodge sends out "eLookouts" with updates about the lodge around once a month.

Chapters 
The Shawnee Lodge is made up of nine chapters. Each chapter represents a district within the Greater St. Louis Area Council.
 Boone Trails
 Gravois Trail
 New Horizons
 North Star
 Osage
 Ozark Trailblazers
 Pathfinder
 River Trails
 Keystone

Nisha Kittan Lodge

Chapters 
Nisha Kittan Lodge is divided into six chapters. They are listed below.

Black Gold
Cahokia Mounds
Illini
Kaskaskia
Piasa Bird
Clair

Woapink Lodge

Chapters 
Woapink Lodge is divided into two chapters. Each chapter represents a district within the Greater St. Louis Area Council. They are listed below.

Arrowhead
Redhawk

See also
Scouting in Illinois
Scouting in Missouri
List of councils (Boy Scouts of America)
List of council camps (Boy Scouts of America)

References 

Local councils of the Boy Scouts of America
Central Region (Boy Scouts of America)
Youth organizations based in Missouri
1911 establishments in Missouri